Dorothy Bussy ( Strachey; 24 July 1865 – 1 May 1960) was an English novelist and translator, close to the Bloomsbury Group.

Family background and childhood 

Dorothy Bussy was a member of the Strachey family, one of ten children of Jane Strachey and the British Empire soldier and administrator Lt-Gen Sir Richard Strachey. Writer and critic Lytton Strachey and the first English translator of Freud, James Strachey, were her brothers. She was educated at the Marie Souvestre girls' school at Les Ruches, Fontainebleau, France and later in England when Souvestre removed the school to Allenswood there. She was later a teacher with Souvestre, and one of her pupils was Eleanor Roosevelt.

Personal life 

In 1903, Dorothy (37) married the French painter Simon Bussy (1870–1954), who knew Matisse, and was on the fringes of the Bloomsbury circle. He was five years younger, and the son of a shoemaker from the Jura town of Dole. Lady Strachey’s liberalism faltered at the sight of him actually cleaning up his plate with pieces of bread. The family drama "shook the regime of Lancaster Gate to its foundations" (Holroyd), and, despite the silent disapprobation of the older Stracheys, Dorothy remained determined to marry him with what her brother Lytton later called "extraordinary courage".

Dorothy was bisexual and was involved in an affair with Lady Ottoline Morrell. She became friends with Charles Mauron, the lover of E.M. Forster.

Writing 

Bussy anonymously published one novel, Olivia, in 1949, printed by the Hogarth Press, the publishing house founded by Leonard and Virginia Woolf, in which lesbian loves get entangled in the emotional and sexually charged atmosphere of erotic pedagogy in a girls' school. As well as drawing on her own experiences in the schools of Marie Souvestre, the novel's theme probably owes much to Bussy's viewing of the 1931 German film Mädchen in Uniform, that had been distributed in England before the Second World War. It may also owe something to Colette's novel Claudine at School (1900). Bussy's novel was translated into French and appeared in France with an introduction by Rosamond Lehmann.  In 1951, the novel was filmed as Olivia, with the lesbian elements toned down, in France by Jacqueline Audry. A BBC radio dramatisation was broadcast in the 1990s. In 1999, her novel appeared at number 35 on Publishing Triangle's '100 best lesbian and gay novels' list.

Bussy was also a close friend of the French Nobel Prize winning author André Gide, whom she met by chance in the summer of 1918 when she was fifty-two, and with whom she struck up a lively correspondence. She adored him and translated all his works into English. Their long-distance friendship lasted for over thirty years. Their letters are published in Richard Tedeschi's Selected Letters of Andre Gide and Dorothy Bussy, and there is also a three-volume French edition. The originals are preserved in the British Library.

Her daughter was the painter Jane Simone Bussy (1906–1960).

Legacy 
Olivia Records was a collective founded in 1973 to record and market women's music, named after the heroine of the 1949 novel Olivia by Bussy (the heroine and the novel both being named Olivia.)

References

 Michael Holroyd, Lytton Strachey: The New Biography, 1994.

External links
Review of reprint of Olivia

Translated Penguin Book - at  Penguin First Editions reference site of early first edition Penguin Books.

1865 births
1960 deaths
English women novelists
British bisexual writers
French–English translators
Dorothy Bussy
Bisexual women
English LGBT novelists
20th-century English women writers
20th-century English writers
20th-century translators
Literary translators